The following highways are numbered 892:

United States